The Yokohama–Yokosuka Road (横浜横須賀道路 Yokohama-Yokosuka dōro) is a toll road that links the city of Yokosuka, Kanagawa on the south end of the Miura Peninsula to Yokohama. It is numbered E16 under the "2016 Proposal for Realization of Expressway Numbering."

Future
A branch line of the toll road will be incorporated into the southern portion of the Ken-Ō Expressway when the branch line is linked with the Shin-Shōnan Bypass.

See also

References

External links
 East Nippon Expressway Company

1980 establishments in Japan
Expressways in Japan
Regional High-Standard Highways in Japan
Toll roads in Japan